Alan Elliott (11 June 1925 – 20 May 2006) was an Australian rules footballer who played for the Geelong Football Club in the Victorian Football League (VFL).

Notes

External links 

1925 births
2006 deaths
Australian rules footballers from Victoria (Australia)
Geelong Football Club players
Coburg Football Club players